Pablo Centurión was a Paraguayan football goalkeeper who played for Paraguay in the 1950 FIFA World Cup. He also played for Cerro Porteño.

In 1951, Centurión joined Fútbol Profesional Colombiano side Boca Juniors de Cali. He played for Boca Juniors for seven years, before moving to Millonarios, Atlético Nacional and Santa Fe.

Centurión is deceased.

References

External links

Year of birth missing
Year of death missing
Paraguayan footballers
Paraguay international footballers
Association football goalkeepers
Categoría Primera A players
Cerro Porteño players
Millonarios F.C. players
Atlético Nacional footballers
Independiente Santa Fe footballers
1950 FIFA World Cup players